The BTA Best Balkan Athlete of the Year, or simply Balkan Athlete of the Year (Bulgarian: БТА спортист на Балканите) is an annual sports athlete of the year award. The winner of each year's award is announced by the Bulgarian Telegraph Agency (BTA). The award is given to the year's top performing individual athlete that has citizenship from one of the nations of the Balkans region, which includes the twelve nations of: Albania, Bosnia and Herzegovina, Bulgaria, Croatia, Greece, Kosovo, Montenegro, North Macedonia, Romania, Serbia, Slovenia, and Turkey, and previously included the former nations of Yugoslavia and Serbia and Montenegro. The award winners are chosen by the votes of a panel of sports journalists and editors from the following ten Balkan nation's news media outlets: the Albanian Telegraphic Agency (ATA), the Bulgarian Telegraph Agency (BTA), which also announces each year's winners, the Romanian AGERPRES, the Greek Athens-Macedonian News Agency (ANA-MPA), the Turkish Anatolian Agency (AA), the Croatian News Agency (HINA), the Bosnia and Herzegovina Federal News Agency (FENA), the North Macedonia Media Information Agency (MIA), the Montenegrin News Agency (MINA), and the Serbian TANYUG Correct. 

All athletes that have citizenship from a country that is a part of the Balkans region, both men's and women's, and that compete in all age categories and all levels of competition, are eligible for the award. Balkan athletes from all sports competitions, both individual sports and team sports, are eligible for the award. Balkan athletes are also eligible for the award regardless of what country in the world that they compete in, as they do not have to compete in a Balkans nation to be eligible to win the award.     

The first Balkan Athlete of the Year award was given for the year 1973. It was won by Svetla Zlateva, a Bulgarian sprinter and middle-distance runner. The Serbian tennis player Novak Djokovic, has won the most awards, having won the award a total of seven times (2011–2015, 2019, 2021).

Balkan Athlete of the Year award winners (1973–present)

References

External links
BTA official website  
BTA official website  

1973 establishments in Albania
1973 establishments in Bulgaria
1973 establishments in Greece
1973 establishments in Romania
1973 establishments in Turkey
1973 establishments in Yugoslavia
Albanian awards
Albania sport-related lists
Awards established in 1973
Bosnia and Herzegovina awards
Bosnia and Herzegovina sport-related lists
Bulgarian awards
Bulgaria sport-related lists
Croatian awards
Croatia sport-related lists
Greek awards
Greece sport-related lists
Kosovan awards
Kosovo sport-related lists
Lists of award winners
Lists of sportspeople
Montenegrin awards
Montenegro sport-related lists
Macedonian awards
North Macedonia sport-related lists
Romanian awards
Romania sport-related lists
Serbian awards
Serbia sport-related lists
Serbia and Montenegro awards
Serbia and Montenegro sport-related lists
Slovenian awards
Slovenia sport-related lists
Sport in Albania
Sport in Bosnia and Herzegovina
Sport in Bulgaria
Sport in Croatia
Sport in Greece
Sport in Kosovo
Sport in Montenegro
Sport in North Macedonia
Sport in Romania
Sport in Serbia
Sport in Serbia and Montenegro
Sport in Slovenia
Sport in Turkey
Sport in Yugoslavia
Turkish awards
Turkey sport-related lists
Yugoslav awards
Yugoslavia sport-related lists